William Lindsay (July 15, 1840 – December 6, 1927) was a member of the Wisconsin State Assembly.

Biography
Lindsay was born on July 15, 1840 in Dundee, Scotland. He would later move to Trenton, Dodge County, Wisconsin. After living for a time in Olmsted County, Minnesota, he moved to Milwaukee, Wisconsin in 1874.

Career
Lindsay was elected to the Assembly in 1882. Previously, he was Chairman of the Olmsted County Board in 1866. He was a Republican.

References

Politicians from Dundee
Scottish emigrants to the United States
People from Trenton, Dodge County, Wisconsin
People from Olmsted County, Minnesota
Politicians from Milwaukee
Republican Party members of the Wisconsin State Assembly
Minnesota Republicans
1840 births
1927 deaths